Rinodina colobina is a species of lichen belonging to the family Physciaceae.

It is an epiphyte which grows on the bark of trees. In Greece, it can use Melia azedarach as a host tree.

See also
 List of Rinodina species

References

Lecanoromycetes
Lichens of Europe
Lichen species
Lichens described in 1810